The 73rd Writers Guild of America Awards honored the best writing in film, television and radio of 2020. Nominees for television and radio were announced on February 3, 2021, while nominees for film were announced on February 16, 2021. The winners were announced in a virtual ceremony on March 21, 2021.

Winners and Nominees

Film

Television

Children's

Documentary

News

Radio

Promotional writing

Special awards

References

External links 
 

2020
2020 film awards
2020 in American cinema
2020 in American television
2020 television awards
2020 awards in the United States
March 2021 events in the United States